Bleak House were  a British heavy metal band formed in 1972. They are best known for their song "Rainbow Warrior", which gained fame due to its similarities with the 1986 Metallica song "Welcome Home (Sanitarium)". After being inactive for nearly 40 years, the band announced that they would be reuniting for a one-off show for the Keep it True Festival in Lauda-Königshofen, Germany, as part of the 2021 setlist, which was then postponed to 2022 due to the COVID-19 pandemic.

Personnel

Former members 

 Jon Kocel – bass
 Maurice Hollingsworth – drums
 Bob Bonshor – guitar
 Graham Killin – guitar, vocals
 Graham Shaw – vocals
 Paul Hornby – bass
 Gez Turner – bass
 Roy Reed – drums
 Ronnie Neighbour – vocals
 Jim Winspur – vocals

Discography
Source:
 Rainbow Warrior (EP, 1980, Buzzard Records)
 Lions in Winter (EP, 1982, Buzzard Records)
 Live 1980 (Live album, 2000, Self-released)
 Suspended Animation (Compilation, 2009, Buried by Time and Dust Records)
 Bleak House (Compilation, 2013)

References

English heavy metal musical groups
Musical groups established in 1972
1972 establishments in England
Musical groups from St Albans
New Wave of British Heavy Metal musical groups